{{Infobox person
| name        = Tony Ward
| image       = 
| image_size  = 
| caption     = 
| birth_name  = Anthony John Ward
| birth_date  = 1924
| birth_place = Sydney, New South Wales, Australia
| death_date  = 9 May 2006 (aged 82)
| death_place = Lady Davidson Hospital, Turramurra, New South Wales
| known_for   = Reporter on "Seven Days ad A Current Affair
| education   = 
| employer    = 
| occupation  = 
| title       = 
| spouse      = 
| partner     = 
| children    =  
| parents     = 
| relatives   = 
| signature   = 
| website     = 
| footnotes   = 
}}

Anthony John "Tony" Ward (1924 – 9 May 2006) was an Australian television actor, director and producer and journalist. He is regarded as Australian television's original action star, on Hunter, and was an inaugural reporter on two national current affairs programs, Seven Days and A Current Affair.

Life
Anthony John Ward was born in Sydney. His father was a public servant. He was educated at a Catholic primary school before going to Parramatta Marist High School, and then became a trainee radiographer at Lewisham Hospital in 1942.

Early career in the theatre
After World War II, he developed an interest in theatre and acted in and directed productions for several Australian and New Zealand companies, including J. C. Williamson and Garnet H. Carroll. He appeared with actors such as Robert Morley, Emlyn Williams, John McCallum, and Googie Withers.

Television career
However, he realised the potential of television and joined Channel 9 in Adelaide soon after television began there in 1959. He worked as a producer and director, and also appeared as a newsreader and in advertisements. He became the first television reporter for Channel 7's Seven Days program and then joined Bill Peach on Channel 10's Telescope current affairs program.

In 1966, Crawford Productions chose him for the title role of Hunter, their new James Bond-style action series. He said of this role:  "Hunter was a project which fired my imagination. I had no doubts about giving up a good career in current affairs for an opportunity like this – it was Heaven sent." He starred opposite Gerard Kennedy who played his arch enemy. The series rated highly and he travelled around Australia and overseas on location, performing many of his own stunts. He left the series after disagreements with Crawfords, particularly over the quality of the later scripts. He said, "The firm has shown initiative, courage and ambition and has made a valiant effort ... But 39 episodes of Hunter this year was far too ambitious. This outstripped the ability of the scriptwriters."

He returned to current affairs, becoming the first reporter on Mike Willesee's A Current Affair program in 1971. He is recognised as the person who discovered Australian comedian and actor Paul Hogan. Willisee was looking for a comedian to do a weekly commentary on events, and Ward suggested Hogan having seen him on the New Faces television show. Ward auditioned Hogan by interviewing him on Sydney Harbour Bridge where he worked as a rigger. Ward was the only original reporter still on A Current Affair when it was cancelled in 1978.

Ward appeared in other television series such as Sons and Daughters, Skippy, The Long Arm and Dynasty. He reported for ABC's Nationwide'' and made documentaries for SBS Television, and also appeared in television commercials, including for Ardath cigarettes and car insurance.

Interests
Ward had a number of other interests including cars and trains. He was a member of the Rolls-Royce Bentley Owners Club, and he took thousands of feet of film and videos of steam train trips in Australia and overseas. He had a banana plantation in Coffs Harbour, New South Wales, and ran an antique print gallery in Sydney's Woollahra, New South Wales. He also cultivated prize-winning roses.

References

Bibliography
  
 
  
 

Australian television presenters
Australian male television actors
Male actors from Sydney
1924 births
2006 deaths